The EOS 400D, called Digital Rebel XTi in North America and EOS Kiss Digital X in Japan, is an entry-level digital single-lens reflex camera introduced by Canon on 24 August 2006.

Details 
It is the successor of the Canon EOS 350D, and upgrades to a 10.1 megapixel CMOS sensor, a larger continuous shooting buffer, an integrated image sensor vibrating cleaning system (first used in a Canon EOS DSLR), a more precise nine-point autofocus system from the EOS 30D, improved grip, and a bigger  LCD with 230,000 pixels and a larger viewing angle which replaces the top status screen.

The 400D uses the DIGIC II image processor, as is used in the 350D. The 400D file numbering system holds 9,999 pictures, as opposed to 100 photos in one folder with the 350D. Support for the Media Transfer Protocol (MTP) USB protocol is available since version 1.1.0. The latest firmware  available is version 1.1.1.

It was succeeded by the Canon EOS 450D (Rebel XSi in North America) which was announced at the PMA show in January 2008 with sales commencing in April 2008.

Custom firmware 
400plus is a firmware add-on which offers additional functionality for Canon 400D, such as intervalometer and custom autofocus patterns.

See also 
 Canon EF lens mount
 Canon EF-S lens mount
 Canon EOS

References

External links 
 
 

Cameras introduced in 2006
400D